Karyna Dziominskaya (born 25 August 1994) is a Belarusian archer competing in women's recurve events. She represented Belarus at the 2019 European Games in Minsk, Belarus winning the silver medal in the women's team recurve event. She also competed in the women's individual recurve event.

At the 2019 Military World Games in Wuhan, China, she won the gold medal in the women's team event.

In 2021, she represented Belarus at the 2020 Summer Olympics in Tokyo, Japan in the team and individual events. Her team (she, Hanna Marusava, and Karyna Kazlouskaya) placed fourth.

References

External links 
 

Living people
1994 births
Place of birth missing (living people)
Belarusian female archers
Archers at the 2019 European Games
European Games silver medalists for Belarus
European Games medalists in archery
Olympic archers of Belarus
Archers at the 2020 Summer Olympics
20th-century Belarusian women
21st-century Belarusian women